São Raimundo Esporte Clube, commonly referred to as São Raimundo, is a Brazilian professional club based in Manaus, Amazonas founded on 18 November 1918. It competes in the Campeonato Amazonense Second Division, the second tier of the Amazonas state football league.

The club is named after their neighborhood, which is named after Saint Raymond. Saint Raymond is also the patron saint of the neighborhood of São Raimundo.

History
In 1915, Risópolis Clube Recreativo was founded by Francisco Rebelo and Professor Assis. On November 18, 1918, the club changed its name to Risófoli Clube Recreativo. In December of the same year the club changed its name to São Raimundo Esporte Clube.

In 1956, São Raimundo played for the first time in Campeonato Amazonense First Division. In 1961, the club won their first state championship. From 1999 to 2001, the club won three Copa Norte titles in a row. These were the club's first regional competition titles.

In 1999, after finishing second in the Brazilian Série C, São Raimundo earned promotion to the Série B, the second division of Brazilian football. It stayed there until 2006, when São Raimundo were relegated to the Série C following a poor campaign in which the club finished 19th out of 20 clubs.

Stadium

São Raimundo's stadium is Estádio Ismael Benigno, inaugurated in 1961, with a maximum capacity of 16,000 people.

Rivals
São Raimundo's greatest rivals are Nacional, Rio Negro and Sul América.

Anthem
The club's anthem was composed by Francisco da Silva, in 1997, and it is called just São Raimundo.

Honours
 Copa Norte
 Winners (3): 1999, 2000, 2001

 Campeonato Amazonense
 Winners (7): 1961, 1966, 1997, 1998, 1999, 2004, 2006

 Campeonato Amazonense Second Division
 Winners (1):  2017

External links
São Raimundo at Arquivo de Clubes
 Unofficial website

São Raimundo Esporte Clube (AM)
Association football clubs established in 1918
Football clubs in Amazonas (Brazilian state)
1918 establishments in Brazil
Copa Norte winners